Chim may refer to:

Chim, Iran. a village in Jarahi Rural District, Iran
CHIM-FM, a radio station in Timmins, Ontario, Canada
CHIM-FM-5, a former radio station in Red Deer, Alberta, Canada, rebroadcaster of CHIM-FM

People
Zhan (surname), romanized as Chim in Cantonese
Chim Pui-chung (born 1946), Hong Kong politician
Jim Chim (born 1965), Hong Kong stage actor and comedian
Rama II of Siam (1767–1824), birth name Chim
Chim Lingrel (1899–1962), American football player 
David Seymour (photographer) (1911–1956), nicknamed Chim, Polish photographer